Workers Unitarian Party was a political party in La Vall d'Uixó, Valencian Community, Spain.

PUT contested the 1991 and 1995 municipal elections. In 1995 it obtained 1,234 votes (7.22%) and one seat on the municipal council.

Political parties in the Valencian Community